Prince Félix of Bourbon-Parma (later Prince Félix of Luxembourg; 28 September 1893 – 8 April 1970) was the husband of Charlotte, Grand Duchess of Luxembourg and the father of her six children, including her successor Jean, Grand Duke of Luxembourg. By birth to his father Robert I, Duke of Parma, he was a member of the House of Bourbon-Parma and one descendant of King Philip V of Spain. Prince Félix was the longest-serving consort of Luxembourg.

Early life
Prince Félix was one of the 24 children of the deposed Robert I, Duke of Parma, being the duke's sixth child and third son by his second wife, Maria Antonia of Portugal. His maternal grandparents were Miguel of Portugal and Adelaide of Löwenstein-Wertheim-Rosenberg. He was born in Schwarzau am Steinfeld.

He was also the younger brother (by sixteen months) of Empress Zita of Austria. Of the twelve children of Duke Robert's first marriage to Maria-Pia of the Two Sicilies, three died as infants, six had learning difficulties, and only three married. Despite the loss of his throne, Duke Robert and his family enjoyed considerable wealth, travelling in a private train of more than a dozen cars among his castles at Schwarzau am Steinfeld near Vienna,  in northwest Italy, and the magnificent Château de Chambord in France.

Less than four months after Robert's death in 1907 the Grand Marshal of the Austrian Court declared six of the children of his first marriage legally incompetent, at the behest of Duchess Maria Antonia. Nonetheless, Robert's primary heir was Elias, Duke of Parma, (1880–1959), the youngest son of the first marriage and the only one to father children of his own. Duke Elias also became the legal guardian of his six elder siblings. Although Félix's elder brothers, Prince Sixte and Prince Xavier, eventually sued their half-brother Duke Elias to obtain a greater share of the ducal fortune, they lost in the French courts, leaving Prince Félix with modest prospects.

Félix served in the Austrian Dragoons as Lieutenant and Captain, but resigned his commission in November 1918.

Marriage to Grand Duchess Charlotte
On 6 November 1919 in Luxembourg, the prince married his first cousin Grand Duchess Charlotte of Luxembourg, having been admitted to the nobility of Luxembourg and also made Prince of Luxembourg by Grand Ducal decree the day before. Unlike some European consorts, Félix neither adopted his wife's dynastic surname (of Nassau), nor relinquished his own title and name "Prince of Bourbon-Parma". His traditional style as a Bourbon prince of the Parmesan branch is the reason that cadet members of the Grand Ducal Family of Luxembourg enjoy the style of Royal Highness (but that style belongs to the Luxembourg monarch and heir apparent by right, as the historical prerogative of grand-ducal dynasties).

Felix was president of the Luxembourg Red Cross between 1923 and 1932 and again between 1947 and 1969. He was also Colonel of the Luxembourg Volunteers Company since 1920 and Inspector-General of the Luxembourg Army between 1945 and 1967.

Urban legend has it that Félix lost the Grünewald, a forest owned by the Grand Duchess, at a casino in 1934, but this is false; part of the property was sold, along with Berg Castle, to the Luxembourgian government, with the revenue paying for the upkeep of the grand-ducal household, and was not spent on personal consumption, let alone gambling losses.

During World War II the grand ducal family left Luxembourg shortly before the arrival of Nazi troops, settling in France until their capitulation, in June 1940. Subsequently, the family and the Grand Duchess' ministers received transit visas to Portugal from the Portuguese consul Aristides de Sousa Mendes, in June 1940. They arrived at Vilar Formoso on 23 June 1940. After travelling through Coimbra and Lisbon, the family first stayed in Cascais, in Casa de Santa Maria, owned by Manuel Espírito Santo, who was then the honorary consul for Luxembourg in Portugal. By July they had moved to Monte Estoril, staying at the Chalet Posser de Andrade. On 10 July 1940, Félix, together with his children, Heir Prince Jean, Princess Elisabeth, Princess Marie Adelaide, Princess Marie Gabriele, Prince Charles and Princess Alix, the nanny Justine Reinard and the chauffeur Eugène Niclou, along with his wife Joséphine, boarded the S.S. Trenton headed for New York City, after which they moved to Canada.

Death
Prince Félix died at Fischbach Castle on 8 April 1970. His funeral mass was held at the Cathedral of Notre-Dame and he was later buried in the crypt of the cathedral.

Marriage and children

On 6 November 1919 in Luxembourg, he married Charlotte, Grand Duchess of Luxembourg. They had six children:
 Jean, Grand Duke of Luxembourg (1921–2019), who married HRH Princess Joséphine-Charlotte of Belgium (1927–2005)
 Princess Elizabeth of Luxembourg (1922–2011), who married HSH Franz, Duke of Hohenberg (1927–1977)
 Princess Marie Adelaide of Luxembourg (1924–2007), who married Karl Josef Graf Henckel von Donnersmarck (1928–2008)
 Princess Marie Gabriele of Luxembourg (1925–2023), who married Knud Johan, Count of Holstein-Ledreborg (1919–2001)
 Prince Charles of Luxembourg (1927–1977), who married Joan Douglas Dillon (born 1935), the former wife of James Brady Moseley
 Princess Alix of Luxembourg (1929–2019), who married Antoine, 13th Prince of Ligne (1925–2005)

Titles, honours and awards
28 October 1893 – 5 November 1919: His Royal Highness Prince Felix of Bourbon-Parma
5 November 1919 – 6 November 1919: His Royal Highness Prince Felix of Luxembourg
6 November 1919 – 12 November 1964: His Royal Highness The Prince Consort of Luxembourg
12 November 1964 – 8 April 1970: His Royal Highness Prince Felix of Luxembourg

Honours
National
 : Knight of the Order of the Gold Lion of the House of Nassau
 : President of the Luxembourg Red Cross
  Parmese Ducal Family: Grand Cross of the Order of St. Louis for Civil Merit
Foreign
  Knight Grand Cross of the Order of Fidelity (1931)
   Austro-Hungarian Imperial and Royal Family: Grand Cross of the Royal Hungarian Order of St. Stephen (1917)
 : Grand Cordon of the Order of Leopold
 : Grand Cross of the Royal Norwegian Order of St. Olav (1964)
 : Grand Cross of the Military Order of St. Benedict of Aviz (24 February 1950)
 : Knight of the Royal Order of the Seraphim (18 July 1951)
 : Knight of the Order of the Royal House of Chakri (17 October 1960)
 : Grand Cross of the Order of the Netherlands Lion

Ancestry

Patrilineal descent

Felix's patriline is the line from which he is descended father to son.

Patrilineal descent is the principle behind membership in royal houses, as it can be traced back through the generations - which means that if Prince Felix were to choose an historically accurate house name it would be Robertian, as all his male-line ancestors have been of that house.

Felix is a member of the House of Bourbon-Parma, a sub-branch of the House of Bourbon-Spain, itself originally a branch of the House of Bourbon, and thus of the Capetian dynasty and of the Robertians.

Felix's patriline is the line from which he is descended father to son. It follows the Dukes of Parma as well as the Kings of Spain, France, and Navarre. The line can be traced back more than 1,200 years from Robert of Hesbaye to the present day, through Kings of France & Navarre, Spain and Two-Sicilies, Dukes of Parma and Grand-Dukes of Luxembourg, Princes of Orléans and Emperors of Brazil. It is one of the oldest in Europe.

Robert II of Worms and Rheingau (Robert of Hesbaye), 770 - 807
Robert III of Worms and Rheingau, 800 - 834
Robert IV the Strong, 820 - 866
Robert I of France, 866 - 923
Hugh the Great, 895 - 956
Hugh Capet, 941 - 996
Robert II of France, 972 - 1031
Henry I of France, 1008–1060
Philip I of France, 1053–1108
Louis VI of France, 1081–1137
Louis VII of France, 1120–1180
Philip II of France, 1165–1223
Louis VIII of France, 1187–1226
Saint Louis IX of France, 1215–1270
Robert, Count of Clermont, 1256–1317
Louis I, Duke of Bourbon, 1279–1342
James I, Count of La Marche, 1319–1362
John I, Count of La Marche, 1344–1393
Louis, Count of Vendôme, 1376–1446
Jean VIII, Count of Vendôme, 1428–1478
François, Count of Vendôme, 1470–1495
Charles de Bourbon, Duke of Vendôme, 1489–1537
Antoine of Navarre, 1518–1562
Henry IV of France, 1553–1610
Louis XIII of France, 1601–1643
Louis XIV of France, 1638–1715
Louis, Dauphin of France (1661-1711), 1661–1711
Philip V of Spain, 1683–1746
Philip, Duke of Parma, 1720–1765
Ferdinand, Duke of Parma, 1751–1802
Louis of Etruria, 1773–1803
Charles II, Duke of Parma, 1799–1883
Charles III, Duke of Parma, 1823–1854
Robert I, Duke of Parma, 1848–1907
Felix of Bourbon-Parma, 1893–1970

Footnotes and references

People from Neunkirchen District, Austria
House of Bourbon-Parma
Members of the Council of State of Luxembourg
Princes of Bourbon-Parma
Felix of Bourbon-Parma, Prince
Grand Ducal Consorts of Luxembourg
Austro-Hungarian military personnel of World War I
Luxembourgian people of World War II
Grand Crosses of the Order of Aviz
Grand Crosses of the Order of Saint Stephen of Hungary
Burials at Notre-Dame Cathedral, Luxembourg
1893 births
1970 deaths
Sons of monarchs